The Central La Grange Historic District in La Grange, Kentucky is a  historic district which was listed on the National Register of Historic Places in 1988. It runs primarily along Washington, Main, and Jefferson Sts., Kentucky Ave., and First through Sixth Aves.

It includes the Oldham County Courthouse.  It includes the D.W. Griffith House and the McMahan House which are separately listed on the National Register.

References

Historic districts on the National Register of Historic Places in Kentucky
Victorian architecture in Kentucky
Buildings and structures completed in 1838
National Register of Historic Places in Oldham County, Kentucky
County courthouses in Kentucky
La Grange, Kentucky